Atlanta United 2 are the reserve team of the Major League Soccer club Atlanta United FC. The team plays in MLS Next Pro, the official reserve league of MLS. The team was established on November 14, 2017 and began their first professional season in March 2018.

History
In November 2017, the USL, a Division II sanctioned league by the United States Soccer Federation (USSF), announced that Major League Soccer's Atlanta United had acquired a USL affiliate team and would begin play in the 2018 season. On January 9, 2018, the team name was revealed as Atlanta United 2.

MLS Next Pro
MLS announced that it would be one of the next eight teams to join MLS Next Pro in 2023.

Stadium
The team played their inaugural season at Coolray Field in Lawrenceville, Georgia, with a capacity of 7,362 for soccer games.
Coolray Field is a Triple-A baseball stadium originally built in 2008 for the Gwinnett Stripers, the Atlanta Braves Triple-A affiliate. The stadium has been fitted for semi-professional soccer in a standard baseball to soccer pitch configuration.

Atlanta United 2 announced, on December 14, 2018, that they would play their 2019 home matches at Fifth Third Bank Stadium in Kennesaw, Georgia.

Players and staff

Roster

Technical staff

Year-by-year

Statistics

Most appearances

Most goals

References

External links

 

 
Atlanta United FC
Soccer clubs in Georgia (U.S. state)
Association football clubs established in 2017
2017 establishments in Georgia (U.S. state)
Former USL Championship teams
MLS Next Pro teams
Reserve soccer teams in the United States